Sir Arthur Basil Markham, 1st Baronet (25 August 1866 – 5 August 1916) was a British industrialist and politician.

Life
Markham was born on 25 August 1866 at Brimington Hall in Brimington, near Chesterfield. He was the son of Charles Markham who was part owner of the family coal mine, Markham Colliery, in Chesterfield. On his mother's side he was the grandson of Sir Joseph Paxton, designer of The Great Exhibition's Crystal Palace. He was educated at Rugby School. In 1898 he married Lucy Bertram Cunningham (c.1873–4 February 1960).

Markham served from 1900 to 1916 as Liberal M.P. for the Mansfield Division of Nottinghamshire.
He was created a baronet, Markham of Beachborough Park, Newington, Kent, on 10 July 1911. The districts of Beachborough and Newington are now eclipsed by the Eurotunnel terminus on the outskirts of Folkestone.
Arthur Markham's technical skill, commercial insight and courage helped the development of considerable parts of the English and Welsh coalfields. He managed and owned a number of other coalmines, and there are many villages, businesses, streets and areas in Wales, Derbyshire and South Yorkshire bearing the name Markham. His brother was Charles Paxton Markham owner of Markham & Co. Engineering of Chesterfield. The firm was one of largest suppliers of coal mine winders. His brother was also director of Staveley Coal and Iron Company.

During the First World War, Markham and his wife Lady Lucy Markham nee Cunningham made their house near Folkestone available to the government for the accommodation of overseas officers and also purchased and sent aid packages to British prisoners of war in German hands.  Lady Markham also nursed.  Markham fought tirelessly against the recruitment of under age soldiers into the British Army during the war, and ultimately, these efforts contributed to his untimely death at the age of 49.

Markham died of a heart attack on 5 August 1916 at Newstead Abbey near Mansfield.

Family
His sister Violet Markham also stood as an Independent Liberal for Mansfield at the 1918 general election.
For her wartime services, Lady Markham was appointed Commander of the Order of the British Empire (CBE) in the 1920 New Year Honours.

Legacy
On his death, his eldest son, Charles, became the 2nd Baronet Markham of Arusha, East Africa.

After his death, his sister Violet arranged for an annual competition to be held in memory of her brother. The Arthur Markham Memorial Fund was used to give a prize for the best essay written by a manual worker on a subject chosen for that year. The competition had been chosen as both Markhams (Violet and Arthur) believed that there was untapped intelligence that needed to be rewarded.

References

1866 births
1916 deaths
Baronets in the Baronetage of the United Kingdom
Liberal Party (UK) MPs for English constituencies
People educated at Rugby School
UK MPs 1900–1906
UK MPs 1906–1910
UK MPs 1910
UK MPs 1910–1918
People from Brimington
English philanthropists
Markham family